Yoson An (born June 23, 1992) is a Chinese-born New Zealand actor and filmmaker.

Early life
An was born in China and grew up learning English at an international school in Macau. His parents left China for more economic opportunities abroad, moving to New Zealand. The family settled in Auckland when An was seven years old. He has three younger sisters, one of whom named Avena was born in Auckland.

Despite not being educated in a Chinese system, An speaks Cantonese and Mandarin fluently. However, he cannot read or write Chinese. He has learned to recognize some Han characters, though. He had an ex-girlfriend from Taiwan who helped polish up his Mandarin.

An was educated at Saint Kentigern College in Pakuranga Auckland; he studied music and was part of many school productions.

Career
An began acting on screen in 2012 in small projects before getting his first big break with Ghost Bride. He eventually decided to move to Australia to pursue more opportunities. "I feel like Australia has more opportunities for non-white actors to break into the film industry than we do in New Zealand...I also believe Australia has a lot more actors in general than we do in New Zealand.... [SBS is] known for having accurate multicultural representation of Australia on screen." An was cast in Dead Lucky which he considers a big opportunity for him as it is a major leading role with Rachel Griffiths. He made the leap to American cinema with the Walt Disney Pictures live-action film adaptation of Mulan, which reunited him with Dead Lucky co-star Xana Tang.

Personal life
An is a black belt in karate, and also practices kickboxing, ninjutsu, powerlifting and Olympic weightlifting.

Filmography

Theatre

References

External links

Living people
1992 births
Chinese emigrants to New Zealand
Male actors of Chinese descent
21st-century New Zealand male actors
New Zealand male television actors
New Zealand male film actors